Darko Matić ( born September 26, 1980) is a retired Croatian professional football player who played as a defensive midfielder. He is currently the Sports Director of Chinese Super League side Dalian Yifang.

Club career
Matić left his country because of the Yugoslav Wars and would move to Germany to begin his football career with Tennis Borussia Berlin's youth team and Tennis Borussia Berlin first team . He played his first game in the first team in the second division in Germany when he was 17, under the coach Winfried Schaefer. In summer 2000 he would join second tier Swiss football club FC Thun. Matic would help FC Thun winning the promotion after 50 years at the end of the 2001-02 season. In 2002, he signed  for HNK Orašje in the Bosnian-Herzegovinian Premier League. In 2004, Matić joined German team 1. FC Eschborn for a short period. In the 2004–05 league season he would join once again top tier side NK Orašje and play in the Premier League of Bosnia and Herzegovina, helping them finish third and win the Bosnian-Herzegovinian Cup. Once again moving on to this time Slovak football club FC Senec in the 2005–06 league season he would help them win promotion to the Slovak Superliga. He was captain of his team Senec and he got an invitation from the Slovak Football Federation to play for the Slovakia national football team.

He transferred to Chinese Super League club Tianjin Teda in 2007 and would quickly become an integral member of the team by playing in all 28 games of the season. The following season when he aided the team to a fourth-place finish and had a chance to play AFC Champions League football. At the beginning of the 2009 league season Beijing Guoan were interested at his defensive abilities and signed him, this was to prove a successful signing when Matić once more quickly became an integral member of the team and aided Beijing to win their first league title.

Matić featured in most Beijing Guoan matches since joining the club including a run into the last 16 of the AFC Champions League where Guoan lost out to the eventual runners-up, Korean side FC Seoul. He scored a rare goal toward the end of 2014 in a 2-2 draw with Shandong Luneng.

Matić has become a rare foreign player in Chinese football in that he has played over 200 games for Beijing Guoan by the end of the 2014 Chinese Super League season for one club and is now top of the list for appearances by a CSL foreign player. He subsequently has become a legend with the fans in Beijing and has a following on Sina Weibo of over 1.3 million people. Matić has expressed an interest in staying in China in the future with the possibility of getting involved in coaching.

In January 2016, Matić transferred to fellow Chinese Super League side Changchun Yatai. He announced his retirement in February 2017.

Matić became the director of International Division of Beijing Guoan on 5 April 2017.

Personal life
Matić is ethnic Bosnian Croat. He is fluent in nine languages with those being Chinese, German, Croatian, English, French, Italian, Spanish, Portuguese, and Czech. He has proven his fluency in Chinese with his numerous post-game interviews.

Honours
Beijing Guoan
 Chinese Super League: 2009

References

External links
 
 
 Player profile at sohu.com (Chinese)

1980 births
Living people
People from Posavina Canton
Association football midfielders
Bosnia and Herzegovina footballers
FC Thun players
HNK Orašje players
FC Senec players
Tianjin Jinmen Tiger F.C. players
Beijing Guoan F.C. players
Changchun Yatai F.C. players
Swiss Challenge League players
Premier League of Bosnia and Herzegovina players
Slovak Super Liga players
Chinese Super League players
Bosnia and Herzegovina expatriate footballers
Expatriate footballers in Switzerland
Bosnia and Herzegovina expatriate sportspeople in Switzerland
Expatriate footballers in Slovakia
Bosnia and Herzegovina expatriate sportspeople in Slovakia
Expatriate footballers in China
Bosnia and Herzegovina expatriate sportspeople in China